Twenity 1997–1999 is a compilation album by L'Arc-en-Ciel released on February 16, 2011, simultaneously with Twenity 1991-1996 and Twenity 2000–2010. It collects previously released A-sides and B-sides.

Track listing

2011 greatest hits albums
L'Arc-en-Ciel albums

ja:TWENITY#1997-1999